The Keep is an adventure for fantasy role-playing games published by Mayfair Games in 1984.

Plot summary
The Keep is a scenario for character levels 9-12 based on the movie The Keep. The adventurers battle the evil of the Keep in the age of magic, in the Middle Ages, and in 1941 during the Nazi conquest of central Europe.

The adventure has been divided into three parts, all taking place in the same location but in different eras.  The first part takes place in some unspecified ancient age, centering around a massive battle between the armies of Molasar and the Order of the Dragon.  Part two takes place in the year 1476 as the investigation of the mysterious "Keep" continues, and the final section takes the adventurers to 1941 for a final confrontation involving a horde of German Nazis. A special section is included to make the final encounter easy, complete with extensive statistics for Nazi weapons, equipment, and NPCs.

Publication history
The Keep was written by Daniel Greenberg, Samuel Shirley, Gregory Maples, and Anne Jaffe, and was published by Mayfair Games in 1984 as a 40-page book.

Several properties were discussed but never licensed for the Role Aids line, but an adventure based on the movie The Keep was one of the scant few licensed Role Aids books to appear.

Reception

Rick Swan reviewed the adventure in The Space Gamer No. 72. He commented: "If you're unfamiliar with The Keep, it's not for lack of opportunities.  The original so-so novel has spawned a so-so movie, a so-so boardgame, and now a roleplaying module in the RoleAids series from Mayfair that continues the tradition.  The extraordinary complexity of the storyline which spans eons of struggle against forces of evil makes playing The Keep an ordeal even for the most experienced GM and a near impossibility to the novice." He added that "The designers do deserve credit for attempting to make things manageable." Swan commented that "It's not often a fantasy roleplayer gets a chance to take on the Third Reich, and the uniqueness of the setting makes it a very satisfying encounter for players and GM alike [...]  In spite of the incongruity, the Nazis work surprisingly well; GMs unwilling to tackle the entirety of The Keep might consider lifting this section for use in another campaign." He continued: "As for working your way through The Keep as a whole, good luck.  Assuming the GM is able to get a handle on the storyline (which will require several readings of the module along with a strong imagination to fill in the blanks), there are literally dozens of characters to keep track of through changes in identity, personality, and actions."  Swan concluded his review by saying, "Make no mistake – complexity doesn't always translate into depth, and The Keep is a struggle that doesn't pay off for either the players or the exhausted GM.  With the exception of the Nazis, this is for die-hard 'Keep' fans only."

References

Fantasy role-playing game adventures
Role Aids
Role-playing games based on films
Role-playing game supplements introduced in 1984